Zehrudin Mehmedović (born 15 March 1998) is a Serbian footballer who plays in Singapore for Tampines Rovers. He was a member of the under-17 Serbian national team.

Club career

Čukarički
He made his Jelen SuperLiga debut for Čukarički on away match versus Partizan on 28 May 2014. When he entered into the pitch, he became the youngest player in history of Čukarički and second youngest in football history of Serbia. Mehmedović signed his first three-year professional contract with Čukarički ending of 2015.

Tampines Rovers 
In December 2018, Mehmedovic was offered a trial at Singapore Premier League's side Tampines Rovers. Mehmedovic was brought in by Tampines' assistant coach Fahrudin Mustafić, who said: "He's a young player, but he's very creative. These days, there aren't many No. 10 players who can give you quality final passes and can receive the ball around the box and score.

"So he adds that extra quality and he's doing well so far. It's a huge step for him to come to a foreign country, but he has been training hard and showing signs of improvement."

Career statistics

Club

Notes

International statistics

U17 International caps

U17 International goals

References

External links
 
 Zehrudin Mehmedović stats at utakmica.rs 
 
 

1998 births
Living people
Sportspeople from Novi Pazar
Bosniaks of Serbia
Serbian people of Bosniak descent
Association football midfielders
Serbian footballers
FK Čukarički players
FK Mladost Lučani players
FK BASK players
FK Radnički Beograd players
Tampines Rovers FC players
Serbian SuperLiga players
Singapore Premier League players
Serbian expatriate footballers
Expatriate footballers in Singapore